Scythris noricella is a moth of the family Scythrididae. It was described by Philipp Christoph Zeller in 1843. It has a Holarctic distribution. In Europe, it is found on most of the continent, except Ireland, Great Britain, the Netherlands, Denmark, the Iberian Peninsula, the Baltic region and most of the Balkan Peninsula.

The wingspan is 18–22 mm. Adults are on wing from July to August.
The larvae feed on Epilobium angustifolium.

References

 Scythris noricella in gbif

Moths described in 1843
Moths of Europe
noricella